Malick Mbaye (born 24 November 1996) is a Senegalese professional footballer who most recently played as a defender for North Carolina FC in USL League One.

Career

Amateur
Mbaye played for Soccer Institute at Montverde Academy in Florida. In 2017, he played for SIMA Águilas of the Premier Development League, scoring four goals in 12 games.

In 2019, Mbaye played with Greenville FC of the National Premier Soccer League.

College
Mbaye played college soccer at Clemson University from 2016 and 2019. In his freshman year, he was named to the ACC All-Freshmen Team. In his senior season, he was named ACC Men's Soccer Defensive Player of the Year.

Professional
Mbaye was drafted 33rd overall in the 2020 MLS SuperDraft by Toronto FC. He attended pre-season with Toronto, but left their training camp and signed with North Carolina FC of the USL Championship. He made his debut with the team when he entered as a substitution during a match against Charlotte Independence on 5 September 2020.

References

1996 births
Association football goalkeepers
Clemson Tigers men's soccer players
Living people
North Carolina FC players
Senegalese footballers
SIMA Águilas players
Footballers from Dakar
Soccer players from Florida
Toronto FC draft picks
USL Championship players
USL League Two players
National Premier Soccer League players
Senegalese expatriate footballers
Senegalese expatriate sportspeople in the United States
Expatriate soccer players in the United States